The Cilternsæte (or Ciltern Sætna) were a tribe that occupied the Chilterns, probably in the 6th century AD.

It is unclear whether they were native Britons, Anglians, or West Saxons. Mortimer Wheeler noted the absence of Anglo-Saxon evidence from the Chilterns and suggested the area was a British enclave into the 6th Century, possibly the remnants of a Sub-Roman polity encompassing an area that included London, Colchester, and St Albans. Earlier, J. Brownbill had suggested they were one branch of the West Saxons.

The Tribal Hidage valued their territory at 4,000 hides. This assessment is relatively large compared with those of some other tribes of central England. Eilert Ekwall suggested that "Chiltern" is possibly related to the ethnic name "Celt" ("Celtæ" in early Celtic). An adjective celto- ="high" with suffix -erno- could be the origin of Chiltern.
They became part of Mercia in the 7th century. Previously, they were a Middle Angle tribe.

References

Peoples of Anglo-Saxon Mercia